Cerrillos may refer to:

Argentina
Cerrillos Department, Salta Province
Cerrillos, Argentina
Chile
Cerrillos, Chile
Puerto Rico
Cerrillos, Ponce, Puerto Rico
United States
Los Cerrillos, New Mexico
Uruguay
Cerrillos, Uruguay
See also
Los Cerrillos (disambiguation)